Thokarwadi dam is a gravity dam on the Indrayani River near Maval, Pune district in the state of Maharashtra in India. Krishna river basin water from this reservoir is diverted to the Bhivpuri power house to generate hydro electricity before letting in to a west flowing river which joins Arabian sea

Specifications

Purpose
 Hydroelectricity

See also
 Dams in Maharashtra
 List of reservoirs and dams in India

References

Dams in Pune district
Dams completed in 1922
1922 establishments in India
20th-century architecture in India